Filip Trifonov (4 May 1947 – 6 January 2021) was a Bulgarian actor. He appeared in more than thirty films since 1971. Trifonov's most prominent role is one of his first films The Boy Turns Man, which was released in 1972.

He died of a heart attack at the age of 73 on January 6, 2021.

Selected filmography

References

External links

1947 births
2021 deaths
Male actors from Sofia
Bulgarian male film actors
Bulgarian male stage actors
Bulgarian male television actors
20th-century Bulgarian male actors
21st-century Bulgarian male actors